The Wine Act was a bill enacted by the Parliament of Scotland in 1703.

At a time when England and France were locked in the War of the Spanish Succession, the Act allowed Scots to legally import French wines. It caused anger in England, because it allowed Scottish traders to openly support that nation's greatest enemy (at the time). The Act itself was part of a raft of legislation, all in direct opposition to English commercial and political interest, that was forced through by a majority opposition in the Scottish Parliament in 1703. Other legislation included the Act Anent Peace and War, and the Act of Security (which was given royal assent the following year).

References
 Dand, C.H., The Mighty Affair, Edinburgh (1972), pp. 59–61

Acts of the Parliament of Scotland
1703 in law
1703 in Scotland
Alcohol in Scotland
England–Scotland relations
Trade in Scotland
Economic history of Scotland